Prince was a federal electoral district in Prince Edward Island, Canada, that was represented in the House of Commons of Canada from 1904 to 1968.

History

This riding was created in 1903 from parts of East Prince and West Prince ridings.

It was abolished in 1966 when it was redistributed into Egmont and  Malpeque ridings.

It consisted of the County of Prince.

Members of Parliament

Election results

See also 

 List of Canadian federal electoral districts
 Past Canadian electoral districts

External links 
Riding history for Prince (1903–1966) from the Library of Parliament

Former federal electoral districts of Prince Edward Island